Carlos Seigelshifer (3 September 1928 – 18 July 2021) was an Argentine weightlifter. He competed in the men's middle heavyweight event at the 1956 Summer Olympics.

References

External links
 

1928 births
2021 deaths
Argentine male weightlifters
Olympic weightlifters of Argentina
Weightlifters at the 1956 Summer Olympics
Place of birth missing
Pan American Games medalists in weightlifting
Pan American Games bronze medalists for Argentina
Weightlifters at the 1955 Pan American Games
20th-century Argentine people
21st-century Argentine people